László Zsidai (born 16 July 1986) is a Hungarian footballer who plays for Budaörs and the Hungary national team. He usually plays as a defensive midfielder, and can also play as a defender.

On 19 June 2013 he signed for Debreceni VSC. He commented that he wants to win the Hungarian Championship and he didn't see chance for that with MTK Budapest FC. Szombathelyi Haladás also wanted to sign the centre defensive midfielder but he chose Debreceni VSC] to reach his goal. He previously played for BFC Siofok, FC Volendam, Debrecen and Puskas Akademia FC.
Full international since 2007, he earned three caps for this country.

International career
Zsidai made his first international appearance in February 2007 for a match against the Latvia national team. Hungary won 2–0. He later played several matches for qualifiers Euro 2016. He was named to the national squad but was cut before the tournament began.

Club statistics

Updated to games played as of 19 May 2019.

Honours
MTK Hungária FC
Hungarian League: 2008
Runner-up: 2007

References

External links

HLSZ 
 

1986 births
Footballers from Budapest
Living people
Hungarian footballers
Association football midfielders
Hungary international footballers
MTK Budapest FC players
BFC Siófok players
FC Volendam players
Debreceni VSC players
Puskás Akadémia FC players
Paksi FC players
Budaörsi SC footballers
Nemzeti Bajnokság I players
Nemzeti Bajnokság II players
Eerste Divisie players
Hungarian expatriate footballers
Hungarian expatriate sportspeople in the Netherlands
Expatriate footballers in the Netherlands